Route 255 is a -long local highway in northwestern New Brunswick, Canada.

Communities
 Saint-André

See also
List of New Brunswick provincial highways

References

New Brunswick provincial highways
Roads in Madawaska County, New Brunswick